The Iowa/Nebraska version of the NWA World Tag Team Championship was a National Wrestling Alliance (NWA) professional wrestling tag team championship that was active between 1953 and 1958. The championship was controlled by the NWA's Iowa booking office under Pinkie George and the Nebraska booking office under Max Clayton. Both George and Clayton were founding members of the NWA in 1948 and served on the Board of Directors that decided to let any NWA member, known as a NWA territory to create a local version of the NWA World Tag Team Championship. The Iowa/Nebraska version was one of at least 13 championships bearing that name in 1957. As with all professional wrestling championships, this championship was not won or lost competitively but instead based on the decisions of the bookers of a wrestling promotion which determines the outcome of the matches.

A version of the NWA World Tag Team Championship was promoted in Nebraska as early as May 4, 1949, but it is possible that it was the San Francisco version that Mike and Ben Sharpe defended in the region. The Iowa/Nebraska linage was firmly established in the summer of 1953, no later than on August 11 of that year, when Bill Melby and Billy Darnell were recognized as champions in Iowa and Nebraska. Melby and Darnell also held the Chicago version at the time, but when they lost the championship to Ben and Mike Sharpe on October 17, 1953, only the Iowa/Nebraska version changed hands. In 1958 it was decided to replace the NWA World Tag Team Championship with the Big Time Wrestling World Tag Team Championship, which in turn would be replaced with the AWA World Tag Team Championship in 1960 when a number of promotions left the NWA to form the American Wrestling Association (AWA).

Four teams share the record for the most championship reigns (2), as the teams of Ben and Mike Sharpe, Boris and Nicol Volkoff, The Kalmikoffs (Ivan and Karol Kalmikoff), and Reggie Lisowski and Art Neilson were the only teams to hold the title more than once. Due to the lack of specific dates for many of the championship changes, it is impossible to clearly establish which team had the shortest reign, while the longest reign probably belongs to Guy Brunetti and Joe Tangaro who held the championship for at least 98 days.

Title history
Key

Team reigns by combined length
Key

Individual reigns by combined length
Key

Footnotes

Concurrent championships
Sources for 13 simultaneous NWA World Tag Team Championships
NWA World Tag Team Championship (Los Angeles version)
NWA World Tag Team Championship (San Francisco version)
NWA World Tag Team Championship (Central States version)
NWA World Tag Team Championship (Chicago version)
NWA World Tag Team Championship (Buffalo Athletic Club version)
NWA World Tag Team Championship (Georgia version)
NWA World Tag Team Championship (Iowa/Nebraska version)
NWA World Tag Team Championship (Indianapolis version)
NWA World Tag Team Championship (Salt Lake Wrestling Club version)
NWA World Tag Team Championship (Amarillo version)
NWA World Tag Team Championship (Minneapolis version)
NWA World Tag Team Championship (Texas version)
NWA World Tag Team Championship (Mid-America version)

References

National Wrestling Alliance championships
Tag team wrestling championships
Professional wrestling in Iowa
Professional wrestling in Nebraska
World professional wrestling championships